Lyubimsky District is an administrative and municipal district (raion), one of the seventeen in Yaroslavl Oblast, Russia. It is located in the northeast of the oblast. Its administrative center is the town of Lyubim. Population: 11,789 (2010 Census);  The population of Lyubim accounts for 47.1% of the district's total population.

References

Notes

Sources

Districts of Yaroslavl Oblast